This article lists all non-royal peers who carried extant titles between the years 1060 and 1069.

Peerage of England

|Earl of Hereford (1067)||William FitzOsbern, 1st Earl of Hereford||1067||1072||New creation
|-
|Earl of Kent (1067)||Odo, Earl of Kent||1067||1088||New creation
|-
|Earl of Cornwall (1068)||Robert, Count of Mortain||1068||1095||New creation

References

Lists of peers by decade
1060s in England
 
Peers